Duel of Hearts is a 1991 romantic television film directed by John Hough. Terence Feely penned the screenplay, based on the 1949 Barbara Cartland novel, A Duel of Hearts. The film stars Alison Doody, Michael York, Geraldine Chaplin and Benedict Taylor.

Plot 

Lady Caroline Faye and Lord Vane Brecon meet under unusual circumstances and are immediately attracted to one another. Later, Lady Caroline learns that Lord Brecon has been accused of murder. She embarks on a plan to prove him innocent, while also warning him that his cousin, Gervaise Warlingham, may be trying to frame him. Posing as a commoner, she accepts a position at Lord Brecon's estate as companion to his mother. Will dangerous family secrets keep the lovers apart?

Cast 
 Alison Doody - Lady Caroline Faye
 Benedict Taylor - Lord Vane Brecon
 Michael York - Gervaise Warlingham
 Geraldine Chaplin - Mrs. Miller
 Billie Whitelaw - Dorcas
 Virginia McKenna - Lady Brecon
 Suzanna Hamilton - Harriet Wantage
 Jeremy Kemp - Lord Milborne
 Richard Johnson ...  Lord Belgrave 
 Beryl Reid ...  Lady Augusta Warlingham 
 Jolyon Baker ...  Lord Stratton 
 Adalberto Maria Merli ...  Grimaldi 
 Margaret Mazzantini ...  Zara 
 John Albasiny ...  Gideon 
 Tom Adams ...  Magistrate
 Paula Jacobs ... Landlady

External links 
 

1991 films
British television films
Films shot at EMI-Elstree Studios
Films based on British novels
1992 romantic drama films
Gainsborough Pictures films
TNT Network original films
American romantic drama films
Films directed by John Hough
Films scored by Laurie Johnson
Films with screenplays by Terence Feely
1991 drama films
1992 films
American drama television films
1990s American films